Cathedral of the Holy Mother of God ( or) was a 13th-century Armenian Apostolic cathedral in Arapgir, Turkey.

The Cathedral of Arapgir named Holy Mother of God was built in the 13th century. It was one of the biggest churches in Western Armenia. It was able to house 3,000 people. The cathedral was attacked and looted and burnt in 1915 during the Armenian genocide. After the Armenian genocide the cathedral was repaired and was used as a school. In 1950 the Municipality of Arapgir decided to demolish the cathedral. On September 18, 1957 the cathedral was blown up with dynamite. And later, the land where the cathedral stood was sold to a peasant named Hüseyin for 28,005 lira. 
Today, in place of the cathedral are ruins.

See also 
Arapgir

References 

Armenian Apostolic churches in Turkey
Armenian Apostolic cathedrals in Turkey
Oriental Orthodox congregations established in the 13th century
Demolished buildings and structures in Turkey
Buildings and structures demolished in 1957
Armenian buildings in Turkey
Churches destroyed by Muslims
Destroyed churches in Turkey